Mitchell Point is a cape in the Columbia River Gorge in Hood River County, Oregon, United States.

Little is known about the man named Mitchell for whom the point was named. He was believed to be a trapper who lived and died in the area. There have been some efforts to rename the point Storm Crest, but they have not been successful.

The now-demolished Mitchell Point Tunnel on the Historic Columbia River Highway was bored through the point, which is a cliff that overhangs the Columbia River. The part of the rock through which the tunnel passed was known to the local Native Americans as Little Storm King, and the larger mountain above that point was known as Great Storm King.

References

External links

Historic image of the Mitchell Point Tunnel from Salem Public Library

Landforms of Hood River County, Oregon
Columbia River Gorge
Rock formations of Oregon
Headlands of Oregon